Kang Sang-jae (born 31 December 1994) is a South Korean professional basketball player. He began his career with the Korean Basketball League side Incheon Electroland Elephants and is now playing for Wonju DB Promy.

Early years
A native of Daegu, Kang had been taller than most of his peers as a child and was thus drawn to basketball. He moved to Seoul for high school and attended Hongik University High School. With attention focused on Seoul's traditional powerhouses Yongsan and Kyungbock High Schools, he mostly flew under the radar until the fall 2012 championships, during which he led his high school to win the South Division title and was named tournament MVP.

Career

College
Kang played college basketball for Korea University and was teammates with Lee Jong-hyun. He was mostly a substitute player during his freshman year but established himself by his junior year, especially during the Professional-Amateur series, in which collegiate teams play against KBL professional and reserve teams. He and Lee, dubbed the "Twin Towers" because of their height, led Korea University to a surprise win over a Sangmu team composed of experienced KBL players fulfilling their mandatory military service. During his senior year, Korea University were overshadowed by a dominant Yonsei University team captained by Choi Jun-yong in the collegiate league and competitions but Kang impressed enough to earn a call up to the national team.

Professional
Kang, along with Lee and Choi, was considered one of the "big 3" of the 2016 KBL rookie draft. He was drafted third overall by Incheon Electroland Elephants. In his first season, he averaged 8.20 points, 4.58 rebounds and 0.96 assists as Incheon reached the semi-finals of the playoffs. He won the KBL Rookie of the Year Award. In the 2017–18 season, he averaged 9.63 points, 5.24 rebounds and 1.19 assists. In his 3rd season there, he averaged 11.62 points 5.64 rebounds and 1.39 assists.

Kang enlisted for mandatory military service in June 2020 and was assigned to the Sangmu team after completing basic training. His contract ended following the 2020-21 season and he became a free agent. Wonju DB Promy signed him and veteran Park Chan-hee in a trade-off with Doo Kyung-min and announced that Kang would be added to the team roster immediately after his discharge. He was officially discharged on December 1, returning to the team for the remainder of the 2021-22 season.

National team career

Junior teams
Kang participated in the 2013 FIBA Under-19 World Championship, where he averaged 18.8 points, 2.2 rebounds and 1 assists

Senior team
Kang was named into the squad for the 2019 FIBA Basketball World Cup where he averaged 2.6 points, 1.6 rebounds and 0 assist at the tournament. He was called up to the national team several times while in the military due to injury problems.

Personal life
Kang married his girlfriend in May 2020, weeks before his enlistment.

References

External links
Career Statistics from the Korean Basketball League website 

1994 births
Living people
Daegu KOGAS Pegasus players
Wonju DB Promy players
South Korean men's basketball players
Sportspeople from Daegu
2019 FIBA Basketball World Cup players
Basketball players at the 2018 Asian Games
Asian Games bronze medalists for South Korea
Medalists at the 2018 Asian Games
Asian Games medalists in basketball